Make Progress is the second album from Japanese pop singer Nami Tamaki. The album was Tamaki's first Oricon number-one album. It also reached number two on Billboard Japan's album chart.

Track listing 
Source: Oricon profile
Fly Away
Reason
Daybreak
Future Step
Truth
大胆にいきましょう↑Heart & Soul↑ (Daitan ni Ikimashou)
Make Progress ~Instrumental~
Heroine
暗闇物語 (Kurayami Monogatari)
You
Fortune
DreamerS
Distance
Reason (Reproduction ~flash forward mix~) (bonus track)

Trivia
"大胆にいきましょう↑Heart & Soul↑ (Daitan ni Ikimashou)" is a cover version from "A Perfect Match", a song by the Swedish pop group A-Teens.

References

External links
 Album Oricon profile 

Nami Tamaki albums
2005 albums